The Launch ident was a television station identification used by BBC Two between their launch night in 1964 and the introduction of colour in 1967.

Launch
BBC Two is the second BBC channel and the third channel to air in the UK.

On 20 April 1964, BBC2 planned to launch an evening of programmes beginning at 7:20pm. However, 35 minutes before the new channel went on air, a power failure spread through most of London, affecting BBC Television Centre, where BBC2's programme control was based. BBC1 and BBC News were unaffected as they were still based at Alexandra Palace. The first signs of the new identity were slides containing the BBC2 box logo with the caption 'Will start shortly'. The first night's transmission consisted of this slide interspersed with new bulletins, presented by Gerald Priestland, from the news room at Alexandra Palace, which featured the new logo in the background. At 10pm, the launch night was abandoned and the programme line-up was aired the following evening. The first programme aired was Play School at 11am.

Prior to the launch, the channel was represented by two kangaroo mascots, called Hullabaloo and Custard. Hullabaloo, a mother, represented BBC1, while Custard, her joey, represented the new BBC2. Hullabaloo was so called because BBC1 was entertaining and about song and dance, while Custard was named such because, as one person at the BBC stated, "everything goes with custard".

Components of look
The ident used with the look was a black, white and grey affair. It was an animation that started with grey and black lines flying in from left and right before the white numeral '2' in a black box flies from the top with the BBC logo in the same shade as the bottom line, flies up from the bottom. This animation is accompanied by a trumpeted fanfare, composed by Freddie Phillips, and which was based on the morse code translation of 'B-B-C-2'.

Accompanying this look, static captions of the logo fully formed were used, alongside slides with the day written to the right of the BBC logo. Other slides were used featuring the '2' and BBC logo to the left of the screen with grey and white stripes on the right, which occasionally also featured the days of the week on them. A device used to switch between them was a large numeral 2, which would rotate to reveal one of these slides. These were filmed from the BBC2 NODD room and broadcast live.

The clock face used for this era featured a black background clock with the '2' and BBC logo on the left hand side with a black clock face on the right. Every minute was marked in white, with large Roman numerals every five minute mark. This clock design lasted for a small while, when it was altered to a grey background.

In addition to all of this, BBC2 used in-vision continuity for at least the first few months of its existence, broadcasting the announcer in studio Pres B, Television Centre. The studio featured a desk with BBC2 branding with the day appearing on the wall behind, as well as highlights of the upcoming programmes. This practice was abandoned by BBCs 1 and 2 at about the same time, and the studio vacated.

Promotional and programme slide styles were not uniform at this time and conformed to no specific design. At the time of BBC Two's launch, a number of Testcards were designed to conform to the new 625 line platform. The main one used from BBC2's launch, but dropped with the advent of colour (but continued in regions that still had monochrome until 1976), was Test Card E.

Reuse of the ident
The ident was reused during Afternoon Classics in 2013, on BBC Two, and made its last appearance in December 2016. It was also reused in Northern Ireland during the 90th anniversary of the establishment of BBC Northern Ireland.

See also

 BBC Two "Cube" ident
 BBC One pre-1969 idents

References

External links
TVARK 1964 Idents
TV Room Idents
MHP Ident Zone
625: Andrew Wiseman's Television Room

BBC Two
BBC Idents
Television presentation in the United Kingdom